This page provides supplementary chemical data on benzene.

Material Safety Data Sheet  

The handling of this chemical may incur notable safety precautions. It is highly recommended to seek the Material Safety Datasheet (MSDS) for this chemical from a reliable source such as SIRI, and follow its directions. MSDS for benzene is available at AMOCO.

Structure and properties

Thermodynamic properties

Vapor pressure of liquid

Table data obtained from CRC Handbook of Chemistry and Physics 44th ed. Note: (s) notation indicates equilibrium temperature of vapor over solid, otherwise value is equilibrium temperature of vapor over liquid.

Distillation data

Spectral data

Safety data
Material Safety Data Sheet for benzene:

References

Chemical data pages
Data page
Chemical data pages cleanup